Arthur V. N. Brooks (May 8, 1936 – July 6, 2021) was a member of the Ohio House of Representatives. He died on July 6, 2021.

References

Republican Party members of the Ohio House of Representatives
1936 births
2021 deaths